BB Jodigal or Bigg Boss Jodigal is an Indian Tamil-language reality television dance show, which premiered on 2 May 2021 and broadcast on Star Vijay and streamed on Disney+ Hotstar. Over two years, BB Jodigal has rolled out two seasons.

Format
The show has the concept of Bigg Boss celebrities competing against one another. The show follows the format in Bigg Boss will showcase the dance talents of all the loved Bigg Boss participants from the previous seasons 1 to 4. But the twist is they will have to perform in pairs or Jodis so as to sustain in the show.

Later on, they will be judged and eliminated on the basis of their performances and the last remaining Jodi will be considered as the winner of Bigg Boss Jodigal 2021.

Series overview

Season 1
The first season aired on every Sunday from 2 May 2021 to 21 September 2021 and ended with 16 episodes. Ramya Krishnan and Nakkhul as the judges, television host Erode Mahesh and Dheena as the hosts. The winners of the season were Bigg Boss 4 contestant Anitha Sampath and Bigg Boss 2 contestant Shariq Hassan Khan.

 Title Winners of Bigg Boss Jodigal : Anitha Sampath and Shariq Hassan Khan 
 Runner-up : Gabriella Charlton and Aajeedh Khalique and Jithan Ramesh and Samyuktha

Contestants

Episodes

Season 2
The second season aired on every Sunday at 19:30 from 8 May 2022 to 4 September 2022 and ended with 17 Episodes. Actress Ramya Krishnan has officially once again been appointed as the judge with new judge Sathish Krishnan. Priyanka Deshpande and Raju Jeyamohan as the hosts. The show witnessed three real life couples from Bigg Boss Tamil Contestants and five bigg boss Contestants couples engage in a 17-weeks dancing competition.

The winner of the season was Bigg Boss 5 Contestants Pavani Reddy & Amir and Bigg Boss 2 Contestant Suja Varunee and her Husband Shivaji Dev.

 Title Winners of Bigg Boss Jodigal : Pavani Reddy & Amir and Suja Varunee and Shivaji Dev.
 Runner-up : Abishek Raaja and Nadia Chang

Contestants

Episodes

Adaptations

References

External links 
 

Star Vijay original programming
2021 Tamil-language television series debuts
Tamil-language dance television shows
Tamil-language reality television series
Tamil-language television shows
Television shows set in Tamil Nadu
2021 Tamil-language television seasons
2022 Tamil-language television seasons